Arnaville is a commune in the Meurthe-et-Moselle department in northeastern France.

Geography
The village lies on the left bank of the Rupt de Mad, which flows southeast through the middle of the commune, then flows into the Moselle, which forms the commune's eastern border.

Population

Personalities
It is the birthplace of French composer and conductor André Amellér.

See also
Communes of the Meurthe-et-Moselle department
Parc naturel régional de Lorraine

References

Communes of Meurthe-et-Moselle